Zdeňka Hradilová (27 April 1938 – 26 January 2023) was a Czechoslovak sprint canoer who competed in the mid-1960s. She was eliminated in the semifinals of the K-1 500 m event at the 1964 Summer Olympics in Tokyo.

References 
 Sports-reference.com profile

1938 births
2023 deaths
Canoeists at the 1964 Summer Olympics
Czechoslovak female canoeists
Olympic canoeists of Czechoslovakia
Sportspeople from Hradec Králové